"Most Girls" is a song by American singer Pink, released as the second single from her debut album, Can't Take Me Home (2000). It was released on June 6, 2000, and, after spending 16 weeks on the US Billboard Hot 100 chart, peaked at number four on November 25. The song also reached number one in Australia, where it was certified platinum, number two in Canada and New Zealand, and number five in the United Kingdom.

Critical reception
Stephen Thomas Erlewine highlighted the song in his review of the album Can't Take Me Home for AllMusic. MTV Asia noted that the song was among the album's "edgy cuts" which had "everything it takes to top the charts". Q called the song a standout among the tracks from Can't Take Me Home.

Track listings and formats

US CD single
 "Most Girls" (Skribble & Anthony Acid club mix) – 8:54
 "Most Girls" (Skribble & Anthony Acid's Hard Girls Dub) – 7:32
 "Most Girls" (album version instrumental) – 5:03
 "Most Girls" (album version acappella) – 4:30
 "There You Go" (Hani Mixshow Edit) – 5:32

US DVD single
 "Most Girls" (video)
 "There You Go" (video)
 "Most Girls" (dance mix audio)

UK cassette single
 "Most Girls" (radio edit) – 4:10
 "There You Go" (Sovereign Mix) – 6:20

UK CD single
 "Most Girls" (radio edit) – 4:10
 "Most Girls" (X-Men vocal mix) – 4:53
 "There You Go" (Sovereign Mix) – 6:20
 "Most Girls" (enhanced video) – 4:31

European CD single
 "Most Girls" (radio edit) – 4:10
 "Most Girls" (X-Men vocal mix) – 4:53

Australian CD single
 "Most Girls" (radio edit) – 4:10
 "Hiccup" – 3:32
 "There You Go" (video)
 "Most Girls" (video)

Credits and personnel
Credits are adapted from the liner notes of Can't Take Me Home.

Studios
 Recorded at Brandon's Way (Los Angeles)
 Mixed at The TracKen Place (Hollywood, California)
 Mastered at Powers House of Sound (New York City)

Personnel

 Pink – lead and background vocals
 Babyface – writing, production, keyboard, drum programming
 Damon Thomas – writing, background vocal arrangement
 Sherree Ford-Payne – background vocals
 Tavia Ivey – background vocals
 Paul Boutin – recording
 Manny Marroquin – mixing
 Victor McCoy – assistant engineering
 Ivy Skoff – production coordination
 Herb Powers – mastering

Charts

Weekly charts

Year-end charts

Certifications and sales

Release history

Notes

References

External links
 

2000 singles
Pink (singer) songs
Music videos directed by Dave Meyers (director)
Number-one singles in Australia
Songs written by Babyface (musician)
Song recordings produced by Babyface (musician)
Songs written by Damon Thomas (record producer)
2000 songs
LaFace Records singles